Momoko Tanaka (born 17 March 2000) is a Japanese professional footballer who plays as a goalkeeper for WE League club Tokyo Verdy Beleza.

Club career
Tanaka made her WE League debut on 12 September 2021.

References 

Japanese women's footballers
Nippon TV Tokyo Verdy Beleza players
2000 births
Living people
Association football people from Nagano Prefecture
Women's association football goalkeepers
WE League players
Japan women's international footballers